This is a list of mayors of Munich since 1818.

Kingdom of Bavaria

Free State of Bavaria

See also
Munich
 Timeline of Munich

 
Munich
mayors